Markos Hakim OFM (November 11, 1930 – August 11, 2014) was a Coptic Catholic bishop.

Ordained to the priesthood in 1955, Hakim was appointed the first bishop of the Coptic Catholic Eparchy of Sohag, Egypt in 1982. In 2003, Hakim resigned.

Notes

1930 births
2014 deaths
Coptic Catholic bishops
Franciscan bishops
egyptian Friars Minor